Hans Deunk (born 27 September 1962) is a Norwegian footballer. He played in one match for the Norway national football team in 1982.

References

External links
 
 

1962 births
Living people
Norwegian footballers
Norway international footballers
People from Moss, Norway
Association football defenders
Moss FK players
Fredrikstad FK players